Sam Engola (born June 15, 1958) is a Ugandan businessman and politician. He is the current State Minister for Housing in the Ugandan Cabinet. He was appointed to that position on 27 May 2011. He replaced Michael Werikhe Kafabusa, who was dropped from the Cabinet. In the cabinet reshuffle of 1 March 2015, he retained his cabinet portfolio. Sam Engola is also the elected Member of Parliament for "Erute County South", Lira District.

Background and education
He was born in Lira District, on 15 June 1958. After attending local schools, he studied at the Institute of Shipping and Management Studies, obtaining the Diploma in Clearing & Forwarding, prior to 1996. In 1996, he was awarded the Diploma in Management & Administration, from an undisclosed institution. In 2008, he obtained the Certificate in Leadership & Public Speaking, from the London School of Business and Management.

Career
From 1995 until 1996, he served as a member of the Constitutional Assembly that drafted and promulgated the 1995 Ugandan Constitution. He served as the Chairman of Uganda Air Cargo Limited, from 1995 until 2001. He has continuously represented his constituency in the Ugandan Parliament since 2001. He has business interests in the hotel and tourism industry, dating back to 1990. He is also a member of the National Executive Committee of the ruling National Resistance Movement political party.

See also

References

External links
 Full of List of Ugandan Cabinet Ministers May 2011

Living people
1958 births
Lango people
People from Lira District
Government ministers of Uganda
Members of the Parliament of Uganda
National Resistance Movement politicians
People from Northern Region, Uganda
21st-century Ugandan politicians